The Tie Cup Competition (also known as Copa de Competencia Chevallier Boutell) is a defunct international football tournament played between representatives of the Argentina and Uruguay Associations. It was one of the earliest international football tournaments played between members of different national football associations, played on an annual basis until 1919.

History

The competition was inspired by English FA Cup, with its trophy donated by Francis Hepburn Chevallier-Boutell, president of the Argentine Football Association (AFA), in 1900. 

Initially, the competition included a total of four teams, with two from AFA, one from AUF and one from Liga Rosarina. That format remained until 1907, when the cup was contested between one representative each from Argentina and Uruguay. The participants were determined via qualification cups (Argentine Copa de Competencia Jockey Club and Uruguayan Copa de Competencia).

The Tie Cup was played only by First Division teams until 1918 when the Argentine Association stated that clubs from División Intermedia (the second division by then) were added to the competition.

List of champions

Finals
The following list includes all the editions of the Tie Cup Competition:

Notes

Titles by team

Titles by country

Topscorers
Source:

See also
Copa de Competencia Jockey Club
Copa de Competencia (Uruguay)
Francis Hepburn Chevallier-Boutell

References

Defunct international club association football competitions in South America
Recurring sporting events established in 1900
1919 disestablishments
Argentina–Uruguay football rivalry